The following list sets down the name of each member of the Baháʼí Faith who is the subject of a Wikipedia article. For another index of individual Baháʼís with Wikipedia articles, see :Category:Bahá'ís by nationality.

Family of Baháʼu'lláh 

 Ásíyih Khánum - known by her title Navváb
 ʻAbdu'l-Bahá
 Bahíyyih Khánum
 Mírzá Mihdí
 Shoghi Effendi

Royalty 

 Malietoa Tanumafili II (r. 1962-2007) - chieftain of the government of Samoa.
 Marie of Romania (r. 1914-1927) - queen of Romania.

Artists

Bands 

 Common Market - hip hop duo from the American Pacific Northwest.
 Seals and Crofts - American soft rock duo in the early 1970s.

Musicians 
 Mirza Abdollah - also known as Agha Mirza Abdollah Farahani was a tar and setar player. He is among the most significant musicians in Iran's history
 Randy Armstrong - American musician and composer
 Cindy Blackman - American jazz and rock drummer
 Jeff and Maya Kaathryn Bohnhoff - folk music performers
 Celeste Buckingham - singer/songwriter
 Doug Cameron - Canadian musician/composer
 Vic Damone - American singer and entertainer
 Khalil Fong - American-born Hong Kong singer and songwriter
 Hazel Scott- American pianist and activist 
 Russell Garcia - motion picture composer
 Dizzy Gillespie - American jazz trumpeter
 Andy Grammer - American singer-songwriter
 Red Grammer - American singer-songwriter best known for children's music
 Anousheh Khalili - Iranian-American singer, pianist and songwriter
 Jack Lenz - Canadian composer
 Kevin Locke - Lakota musician and dancer
 Mike Longo - American jazz pianist
 James Moody - American jazz saxophone and flute player
 KC Porter - American multi-Grammy winning producer
 Rachael Price - jazz vocalist
 Tom Price - conductor, composer and producer
 Flora Purim - Brazilian American jazz singer
 Dan Seals - American musician, of England Dan and John Ford Coley
 Tierney Sutton - American jazz singer
 Louie Shelton - American jazz guitarist and producer
 Charles Wolcott - pianist, arranger, composer for Disney and MGM films, credited with bringing rock and roll to the movies
 J. B. Eckl- songwriter, producer, recording artist
 Ryan Abeo - American singer/songwriter from Kentucky who performs under the moniker RA Scion.
 Huening Kai - member of Tomorrow X Together

Broadcasters 
 Susan Aude Fisher News Anchor WIS Columbia SC

Filmmakers 

 Mark Bamford - writer, director (Cape of Good Hope)
 Mary Darling - producer, Little Mosque on the Prairie
 Clark Donnelly - producer, Little Mosque on the Prairie
 Phil Lucas - Native American filmmaker
 Harold Lee Tichenor - film producer

Actors 

 Penn Badgley (Gossip Girl, You)
 Justin Baldoni (Everwood, Jane the Virgin)
 Earl Cameron (Thunderball, The Interpreter)
 Omid Djalili - comedian and actor
 Barbara Hale - Emmy Award winner (Perry Mason)
 Lois Hall - American movie and television actress
 Lloyd Haynes -  actor and television writer
 Jeremy Iversen - actor and writer
 Eva LaRue (All My Children, CSI: Miami)
 Carole Lombard - ranked 23rd greatest American female screen legend, star on the Hollywood Walk of Fame
 Inder Manocha - British Asian stand-up comedian and actor
 Julie Mitchum - American Actress
 Pardis Parker - Canadian comedian
 Alex Rocco - Emmy Award winner (The Famous Teddy Z, The Godfather, The Wedding Planner)
 Rehana Sultan - Indian Actress
 Valeska Surratt - Silent Film Actress
 Travis Van Winkle - American actor, The Last Ship, Hart of Dixie
 Rainn Wilson (The Office, Six Feet Under)

Architects 

 Hossein Amanat (Azadi Tower, buildings of the Baháʼí Arc, House of Worship of Samoa)
 Louis Bourgeois (House of Worship of Wilmette)
 Siamak Hariri (Baháʼí Temple of South America, House of Worship of South America)
 William Sutherland Maxwell (Central Tower of the Château Frontenac; he was also a Hand of the Cause)
 Fariborz Sahba (Lotus Temple, terrace gardens of Haifa)

Writers 
 Burl Barer - true crime genre specializing, author of The Saint, as well as Baháʼí oriented articles
 Maya Kaathryn Bohnhoff - fantasy and science fiction author in short story and longer formats
 André Brugiroux - traveller and author
 Barry Crump - New Zealand comic author
 Rod Duncan - author of the Gaslight series
 William S. Hatcher - mathematician, philosopher, educator
 Robert Hayden - Poet Laureate Consultant in Poetry to the Library of Congress from 1976–1978
 Alain LeRoy Locke - author or books on poetry, race-awareness and research in various arts
 Guy Murchie - philosopher, scientific writer, aviator
 Bahiyyih Nakhjavani - Iranian writer 
 Arvid Nelson - comic book writer, creator of Rex Mundi
 Margaret Bloodgood Peeke - traveler, lecturer, author
 Wellesley Tudor Pole - British writer
 Jeffrey Reddick - creator of the Final Destination series
 Holiday Reinhorn - writer
 Gholamreza Rouhani - poet and satirist
 William Sears - author of multiple books, an Emmy award-winning sportscaster, and host of a children's television program "In the Park."
 Adib Taherzadeh - literary historian of Baha'i sacred texts
 Sverre Holmsen, a Swedish writer, environmentalist, traveller to Tahiti

Other artists 
 Alice Pike Barney - portrait artist
 Laura Clifford Barney - philanthropist
 Hussein Bikar - Egyptian painter
 Amelia Collins - philanthropist
 Sky Glabush - Painter
 Bernard Leach - potter
 Anis Mojgani - spoken-word poet
 Tom Morey - musician, inventor of the bodyboard, founder and namesake for the Morey Boogie bodyboard company
 Fayard Nicholas - American dancer and one half of the Nicholas Brothers
 Rae Perlin (1910-2006) - artist
 Mishkín-Qalam - calligrapher
 Otto Rogers - Painter
 Juliet Thompson - portrait artist
 Mark Tobey - painter
 Gwen Wakeling - Academy Award-winning Hollywood costume designer

Athletes 

 Nelson Évora – Portuguese Olympic gold medal (Beijing, 2008) and gold medal recipient for the 2007 Athletics World Championship in Osaka, Japan in Triple Jump
 Cathy Freeman – Australian Olympic gold medal-winning runner
 Matthew W. Bullock – American soccer player
 Khalil Greene – American professional baseball player
 David Krummenacker – Track & Field World Champion in 800m in 2003, NCAA Champion (Georgia Tech) 1997, 1998
 Pellom McDaniels – American professional gridiron football player
 Luke McPharlin – Australian footballer for the Fremantle Dockers

Business 
 Thornton Chase - first Baháʼí of the West, was a businessman when he joined the religion in 1894/5.
 Mildred Mottahedeh - founder of Mottahedeh & Company
 Steve Sarowitz (born 1965/1966), American billionaire, founder of Paylocity 
 Zhang Xin and Pan Shiyi - famous Chinese business couple
 Zia Mody - Indian corporate lawyer and businesswoman.

Scholarly

Educators 
 Dwight W. Allen - professor, author, education reformer, consultant and advisor to UNESCO and the World Bank Group
 Alessandro Bausani - a leading Islamic studies scholar in Italy, professor Naples, Rome
 Ali Murad Davudi - Tehran University professor who disappeared in 1979
 Donna Denizé - American poet and award-winning teacher
 Mae C. Hawes - African-American professor, settlement worker, literacy educator
 Phoebe Hearst - first woman Regent of the University of California
 Auguste-Henri Forel - Swiss myrmecologist, neuroanatomist and psychiatrist
 ʻAlí-Akbar Furútan - Prominent Iranian educator, administered the Tarbiyat School for Boys. Hand of the Cause.
 Jagdish Gandhi - founder of City Montessori School, Lucknow, India
 Firuz Kazemzadeh - historian, member of the National Spiritual Assembly
 Patricia Locke - Lakota Native American educator
 Dr. Pellom McDaniels - professor, researcher, inventor, author, historian, curator at Emory University and the University of Missouri at Kansas City.  Founder of Arts For Smarts Foundation.
 Joseph Watson - Professor of Modern Irish at University College Dublin
 Todd Lawson - Emeritus Professor of Islamic thought at the University of Toronto.

Journalism 
 Robert Sengstacke Abbott - lawyer and newspaper publisher, one of the first self-made African American millionaires of the United States.

Public service 
 David Kelly - former employee of the UK Ministry of Defence (MoD)
 Dorothy Wright Nelson - Senior Judge on the Ninth Circuit U.S. Court of Appeals; former dean, University of Southern California Gould School of Law
 Jacqueline Left Hand Bull - Indian Health care policy administrator
 Layli Miller-Muro - Executive Director of the Tahirih Justice Center
 Mahmud Jamal - Judge on the Supreme Court of Canada
 Payam Akhavan - prosecutor for United Nations tribunals and law professor
 Robert B. Powers - prominent police officer in the history of California during which he co-established one of the earliest training programs for police in matters of race relations.

Scholars (of Baháʼí history, Baháʼí theology, apologetics, etc.)
 Udo Schaefer - A German lawyer and prolific author, specialising in Baháʼí apologetics and theology, notably ethics. 
 Moojan Momen - historian specializing in Baháʼí history and theology
 Peter Smith - historian and sociologist, author of a much-cited academic study of Baháʼí history,  The Babi and Bahaʼi Religions: From Messianic Shiʻism to a World Religion.
 Franklin Lewis - author and translator in Iranian studies, who has also published literary analyses of the works of the Báb and Baháʼu'lláh.
 Robert Stockman - historian, theologian, apologist and biographer, noted especially for works on the Baháʼí community in North America.
 Mírzá Abu'l-Faḍl - (Persian language: ميرزا أبوالفضل‎), or Mírzá Abu'l-Faḍl-i-Gulpáygání (1844–1914) - was the foremost Baháʼí scholar who helped spread the Baháʼí Faith in Egypt, Turkmenistan, and the United States. 
 ʻAbdu'l-Hamíd Ishráq-Khávari - (1902 – 1972) was a prominent Iranian Baháʼí scholar. He became a Baháʼí in 1927. He was a teacher in one of the Baháʼí schools in Iran, until the schools were closed in 1934. He prepared many compilations of Bahá'í writings, commentaries, apologetic works, and historic studies.
 Ali Murad Davudi - (1922–1979?) was an Iranian Baháʼí who was a member of the national governing body of the Baháʼís in Iran. He was a professor at Tehran University in the philosophy department. In 1979, during a wave of persecution toward Baháʼís, he was kidnapped and has been presumed a victim of state execution.

Scientist 
 Dr. Ron McNair - physicist and astronaut; died on the space shuttle Challenger in 1986

Others 
 Leonora Armstrong - international traveler
 Richard St. Barbe Baker - English environmentalist
 Lady Blomfield - early Irish-British Baháʼí, and a supporter of the rights of children and women
 Dr Frederick D'Evelyn - first Irish-born Baháʼí
 Nelson Évora
Constance Langdon-Davies
 Dhabihu'llah Mahrami - wrongfully accused Iranian Baháʼí, found dead in his cell in 2005
 Antony Moynihan, 3rd Baron Moynihan - British hereditary peer
 Nossrat Peseschkian - psychiatrist, psychotherapist; founder of Positive Psychotherapy
Parivash Rohani, Iranian-American Baha'i activist
 Hilda Yen - internationalist, diplomat, aviator
 Lidia Zamenhof - daughter of L. L. Zamenhof, inventor of Esperanto

Other lists 
 List of Apostles of Baháʼu'lláh
 List of the Hands of the Cause of God
 List of the Knights of Baháʼu'lláh
 List of former Baháʼís

References 

 
Baha'i